Absolute Midnight is the third book in the Abarat series by Clive Barker. It is a dystopian fantasy-adventure which follows the story of Candy Quackenbush and her journeys through the world of the Abarat. The book contains more than 125 full color illustrations. The story continues Candy's journey in the extraordinary world of the Abarat with familiar friends and new foes. With war looming on the horizon, Candy is put to the test to save the Abarat from total destruction and rescue the people of Abarat from eternal darkness. Absolute Midnight was released by HarperCollins on September 27, 2011.

Plot summary
Candy Quackenbush visits the enchantress Laguna Munn to remove Princess Boa's soul from her body; upon which, Boa attempts to kill Candy herself. Later in the novel, Boa searches for Christopher Carrion on Gorgossium and (failing to find him) captures Finnegan Hob, her former fiancé. In a brief visit to the human world, Candy resists her father, Bill Quackenbush, who tries to obtain her memories. After return to the Abarat, Candy re-unites with her now-numerous supporters and befriends Christopher Carrion and later his father, Zephario Carrion. Pursued by Mater Motley's subordinates, Candy falls in love with a boy named Gazza, who immediately requites the affection. Gazza later learns that Malingo the Geshrat is also in love with Candy.

At the climax of this installment Mater Motley releases the arthropod 'Sacbrood', who in turn cover the sky and give the book its name, and collaborates with the extraterrestrial Nephauree, who seek to dominate the Abarat. A struggle follows in which much of the Abarat is destroyed or damaged, and wherein Mater Motley encounters the submarine 'Requiax'. At the edge of the Abarat, a Nephauree makes an appearance; Candy uses a piece of the Abarataraba (the Abarat's supreme book of magic) to save Mater Motley's prisoners; Christopher Carrion and Malingo prevent Mater Motley from killing Candy; and Christopher Carrion's siblings are released from the dolls on Mater Motley's dress. Having fallen from the Abarat into the 'Void' beyond, Candy, Malingo, and Gazza enter another, unidentified parallel universe, concluding the book.

Critical reception
Gina Mcintyre of the Los Angeles Times identified protagonist Candy Quackenbush, after reading Absolute Midnight:
"Like Dorothy or Alice before her, 16-year-old Candy is an innocent plucked from the mundanity of her everyday life and thrust into a mystical place filled with untold wonders and horrors. Barker acknowledges his heroine's literary lineage, but he also crafts a wonderfully contemporary girl who is brave, resourceful, loyal and willing to sacrifice herself for the betterment of the world".

References

2011 British novels
2011 fantasy novels
Novels by Clive Barker
Young adult fantasy novels
British young adult novels
Abarat
HarperCollins books